Juha Kiilholma (born 26 June 1982) is a Finnish professional ice hockey player. He is currently playing SaPKo of the Finnish Mestis.

Kiilholma made his SM-liiga debut playing with Pori Ässät during the 2001–02 SM-liiga season.

References

External links

1982 births
Living people
Ässät players
Finnish ice hockey right wingers
HPK players
Oulun Kärpät players
SaiPa players
Tappara players
Sportspeople from Pori